is a privately-owned brewery in Weilheim in the German state of Baden-Württemberg.

History

Waldhaus Brewery was opened in 1833. In 1894 Johann Schmid acquired it and it has been owned by the Schmid family since that time.

References

External links
Official Website

1833 establishments in Germany
Beer brands of Germany
Breweries in Germany
Breweries in Baden-Württemberg
Companies based in Baden-Württemberg
German companies established in 1833